Fernando Castro Santos (born 20 February 1952) is a Spanish retired footballer who played as a defender, and a retired manager.

During his career, he worked in several clubs in his country as well as in Portugal.

Football career
Born in Poio, Province of Pontevedra, Santos began working as a manager at only 30 with local Pontevedra CF, before moving to Galician neighbours SD Compostela in 1989. During his six-year spell at the latter club, he led it from the fourth division to La Liga.

After helping Compos retain their top flight status in the 1994–95 season, Santos stayed in the region, signing with Celta de Vigo and remaining there for two years. He started 1997–98 in Portugal with S.C. Braga, being sacked after a few months (the side eventually reached the domestic cup final) and returning to his country with Sevilla FC, in the second level.

Leaving Sevilla in summer 1999 after the team's top flight promotion, Santos spent the following years at CD Tenerife, Polideportivo Ejido, Córdoba CF, UD Almería and UD Vecindario – all in the country's second tier, safe for 2000–01; he also spent some of the 2002–03 campaign again at Braga, meeting the same fate.

On 9 February 2010, Santos returned to Portugal as a replacement for sacked José Mota at Leixões SC. On 21 October, he returned to his first club Pontevedra after taking over from Ángel Viadero.

Personal life
Castro Santos' son, Diego Castro, is a professional footballer. A winger, he represented with success Sporting de Gijón and Perth Glory FC.

References

External links

1952 births
Living people
Footballers from Galicia (Spain)
Spanish footballers
Association football defenders
Segunda División players
Segunda División B players
Tercera División players
Pontevedra CF footballers
Spanish football managers
La Liga managers
Segunda División managers
Segunda División B managers
Pontevedra CF managers
SD Compostela managers
RC Celta de Vigo managers
Sevilla FC managers
CD Tenerife managers
Polideportivo Ejido managers
Córdoba CF managers
UD Almería managers
UD Vecindario managers
Primeira Liga managers
S.C. Braga managers
Leixões S.C. managers
Spanish expatriate football managers
Expatriate football managers in Portugal
Spanish expatriate sportspeople in Portugal
CD Arenteiro managers